Aibonito may refer to:

Places
Aibonito, Puerto Rico, a municipality
Aibonito, Hatillo, Puerto Rico, a barrio
Aibonito, San Sebastián, Puerto Rico, a barrio
Aibonito barrio-pueblo, a barrio